The 1959 North Carolina Tar Heels football team represented the University of North Carolina at Chapel Hill during the 1959 NCAA University Division football season. The Tar Heels were led by first-year head coach Jim Hickey and played their home games at Kenan Memorial Stadium. The team competed as a member of the Atlantic Coast Conference, finishing in second.

Schedule

References

North Carolina
North Carolina Tar Heels football seasons
North Carolina Tar Heels football